The Evangelical Presbyterian Church in South Africa is a Protestant denomination in the Reformed tradition.

Description
It had a relationship with the Reformed Churches in Switzerland. The organisation's structure is threefold: the parish, the presbytery and the synod. The church has seven presbyteries.

It is a member of the World Communion of Reformed Churches.
Sister denominations are the Presbyterian Church in Mozambique and the Lesotho Evangelical Church.

The organisation subscribes to the Apostles Creed and Nicene Creed.

In 2004, it had 30,000 members, 37 congregations and 7 house fellowships. The organisation's official language is Tsonga.

See also

 Christianity in Africa
 List of Reformed denominations
 Religion in South Africa

References

External links
 epcsa.org.za , the organisation's official website
 Ernest Creux biography
 World Council of Churches website

Year of establishment missing
Members of the World Communion of Reformed Churches
Religious organisations based in South Africa
Presbyterian denominations in Africa
Presbyterianism in South Africa